The 2007–08 Championnat de France Amateurs season was the 10th edition of the competition since its establishment. The competition officially began on 11 August 2007 and ended in May 2008. The competition consists of 72 clubs spread into 4 parallel groups of 18.

It is open to reserve teams in France and amateur clubs in France, although only the amateur clubs are eligible for promotion to the Championnat National. The highest-placed amateur team in each pool are promoted, replaced by the 4 lowest-placed in the Championnat.

The champions each group were Pacy Vallée-d'Eure (Group A), Croix de Savoie (Group B), SO Cassis (Group C), and Bordeaux (Group D), though Aviron Bayonnais FC were promoted to the Championnat National as they are not a reserve side.

Promotion and relegation from 2006–07
Relegated from Championnat National to CFA
 US Raon-l'Étape to Groupe B
 Sporting Toulon to Groupe C
 AS Yzeure to Groupe D
 SO Châtellerault to Groupe D

Promoted from CFA to Championnat National
 Calais RUFC
 AC Arles
 Rodez AF
 Villemomble Sports

Standings

Note: Unlike the higher leagues, a win in the CFA is worth 4 points, with 2 points for a draw and 1 for a defeat.

Groupe A
Last updated 24 May 2008

Groupe B
Last updated 24 May 2008

Groupe C
Last updated 24 May 2008

Groupe D
Last updated 24 May 2008

References
 CFA Official Site
 CFA Scores and Statistics

Championnat National 2 seasons
4
France